Gaeides is a genus of butterflies in the family Lycaenidae.

There are currently three known species:
 Gaeides dione
 Gaeides gibboni
 Gaeides gorogon

Footnotes

References
  (2007): Gaeides. Retrieved 17 May 2008.

Lycaenidae
Lycaeninae
Lycaenidae genera
Taxa named by Samuel Hubbard Scudder